Kyklos is a quarterly peer-reviewed academic journal published by John Wiley & Sons It was established in 1947 by Edgar Salin and is attached to the Faculty of Business and Economics at the University of Basel.  The journal views economics as a social science and favours contributions dealing with issues relevant to contemporary society, as well as economic policy applications.

The editors of the journal are the economists Reiner Eichenberger, Alois Stutzer and David Stadelmann. Honorary Editors are Bruno S. Frey and René L. Frey.

Abstracting and indexing 
The journal is abstracted and indexed in Scopus and the Social Sciences Citation Index. According to the Journal Citation Reports, the journal has a 2018 impact factor of 1.191, ranking it 165 out of 353 journals in the category "Economics".

References

External links 
 

Wiley-Blackwell academic journals
English-language journals
Publications established in 1947
Quarterly journals
Economics journals